The Tank, Light, Mk VI was a British light tank, produced by Vickers-Armstrongs in the late 1930s, which saw service during the Second World War.

Development history

The Tank, Light, Mk VI was the sixth in the line of light tanks built by Vickers-Armstrongs for the British Army during the interwar period. The company had achieved a degree of standardization with their previous five models, and the Mark VI was identical in all but a few respects. The turret, which had been expanded in the Mk V to allow a three-man crew to operate the tank, was further expanded to give room in its rear for a wireless set. It had the Horstmann coil-spring suspension system, which was found to be durable and reliable, although the fact that the tank was short in relation to its width and that it pitched violently on rough ground made accurate gunnery whilst moving exceptionally difficult.

Production of the Mk VI began in 1936 and ended in 1940 with 1,682 Mark VI tanks having been built. Many of those produced were actually variants designed to solve problems found with the original design. The Mk VIA had a return roller removed from the top of the leading bogey and attached to the hull sides instead, and also possessed a faceted cupola. The Mk VIB was mechanically identical to the Mk VIA but with a few minor differences to make production simpler, including a one-piece armoured louvre over the radiator instead of a two-piece louvre, and a plain circular cupola instead of the faceted type. The Mk VIC, which was the last in the MK VI series, had the commander's cupola removed and had wider bogies and three carburettors to improve engine performance; it was also more powerfully armed than the other models, replacing the .303 and .50 Vickers machine guns with co-axial  and  Besa machine guns. A small number of specialized variations were also built based on the Mk VI chassis. The Tank, Light, AA Mk I was built in the aftermath of the Battle of France and was intended to act as a counter-measure against attacks by German aircraft. It featured a power-operated turret fitted with four 7.92 mm Besa machine guns; a Mk II was produced which was mechanically similar but had improvements, such as better quality sights for the machine guns and a larger turret for easier access. A variant on the Mk VIB was produced for service with the British Indian Army, in which the commander's cupola was removed and replaced with a hatch in the turret roof.

Operational history
When the Mk VI was first produced in 1936, the Imperial General Staff considered the tank to be superior to any light tank produced by other nations, and well suited to the dual roles of reconnaissance and colonial warfare. Like many of its predecessors, the Mark VI was used by the British Army to perform imperial policing duties in British India and other colonies in the British Empire, a role for which it and the other Vickers-Armstrongs light tanks were found to be well suited. When the British government began its rearmament process in 1937, the Mk VI was the only tank with which the War Office was ready to proceed with manufacturing; the development of a medium tank for the Army had hit severe problems after the cancellation of the proposed "Sixteen Tonner" medium tank in 1932 due to the costs involved, and cheaper models only existed as prototypes with a number of mechanical problems. As a result of this, when the Second World War began in September 1939, the vast majority of the tanks available to the British Army were Mk VIs; there were 1,002 Mk VI Light Tanks, 79 Mk I (A9) and Mk II (A10) Cruiser Tanks and 67 Matilda Mk I infantry tanks. Of these tanks, only 196 light tanks and 50 infantry tanks were in use by operational units of the army.

When the Battle of France began in May 1940, the majority of the tanks possessed by the British Expeditionary Force were Mark VI variants; the seven Royal Armoured Corps divisional cavalry regiments, the principal armoured formations of the BEF, were each equipped with 28 Mk VIs. The 1st Armoured Division, elements of which landed in France in April, was equipped with 257 tanks, of which a large number were Mk VIB and Mk VICs. The 3rd Royal Tank Regiment, which formed part of the division's 3rd Armoured Brigade, possessed by this time 21 Mark VI light tanks. 

The British Army lost 331 Mark VI light tanks in the Battle of France of 1940. Several of these vehicles were captured by the Wehrmacht, redesignated as Leichter Panzerkampfwagen Mk. IV 734(e) and used for training purposes until the fall of 1942. Then, in November the decision was made to develop a self-propelled gun on the basis of the captured Mk VIs. They carried a 105 or 150 mm field howitzer and were designated G.Pz. Mk. VI (e). All these SPGs were subsequently lost during the defense of France in the summer and fall of 1944. 

The Mk VIB was also used in the North African campaign against the Italians late in 1940 with the 7th Armoured Division. At this time, the British had 200 light tanks (presumably the Mk VIB) along with 75 cruiser tanks (A9, A10, A13) and 45 Matilda IIs. An attack by the 3rd Hussars at Buq Buq on 12 December 1940 resulted in its tanks getting bogged down in salt pans and severely mauled. In ten minutes, 13 tanks were destroyed, ten officers and men killed - including the CO - and 13 wounded. The 7th Armoured Division had 100 tanks left on 3 January 1941; this increased to 120 tanks on 21 January, at which time they were used in flanking far into the rear and gathering up scattered Italian troops, sometimes joining or leaving the main attacks to the cruiser and Matilda II tanks. During an engagement at Mechili on 24 January, six Mk VIs were destroyed by newly arrived superior Italian Fiat M13/40s for no loss, forcing a retreat until cruiser tanks arrived. The 2nd RTR continued to battle the Italians with light tanks as late as 6 February 1941.

Being widely used by the British Army, the tank participated in several other important battles. The Mk VIB made up a significant amount of the tanks sent over to the Battle of Greece in 1941, mostly with the 4th Hussars. Ten Mk VIB tanks fought with the 3rd The King's Own Hussars during the Battle of Crete. The same armoured unit had previously embarked three MK VIB tanks for the Norwegian Campaign, but they were lost in transit to a German aircraft attack. The tanks also saw limited service against the Japanese in Malaya and Dutch East Indies.

Gallery

See also
Comparable vehicles
 Germany Panzer I   
 Italy L3/33, L3/35 
 Japan: Type 94
 Poland: TK-3 and TKS
 Romania: R-1
 Soviet Union: T-27,  T-37A, T-38
 Sweden: Stridsvagn m/37

Notes

References

 
 
 
 Duncan, Major-General N W, "Light Tanks Marks I-VI", AFV Profile No. 5

External links

 WW2 Vehicles website
 Photo gallery at svsm.org 

Light tanks of the United Kingdom
Interwar tanks of the United Kingdom
World War II tanks of the United Kingdom
World War II light tanks
Military vehicles introduced in the 1930s
History of the tank
Light tanks of the interwar period